KICD (1240 kHz) is an AM radio station licensed to serve the community of Spencer, Iowa.  The station broadcasts a news/talk format.  KICD is owned by Saga Communications and licensed to Saga Communications of Iowa, LLC.

The studio, transmitter and broadcast tower are located on the north side of Spencer along  U.S. Route 71. The tower is also used by its sister station KICD-FM.

On June 29, 2018, KICD began simulcasting on FM translator K273DD 102.5 FM Spencer.

References

External links

Spencer, Iowa
ICD
Talk radio stations in the United States
Radio stations established in 1942
1942 establishments in Iowa